In complex analysis, a branch of mathematics, analytic continuation is a technique to extend the domain of definition of a given analytic function. Analytic continuation often succeeds in defining further values of a function, for example in a new region where an infinite series representation in terms of which it is initially defined becomes divergent.

The step-wise continuation technique may, however, come up against difficulties. These may have an essentially topological nature, leading to inconsistencies (defining more than one value). They may alternatively have to do with the presence of singularities. The case of several complex variables is rather different, since singularities then need not be isolated points, and its investigation was a major reason for the development of sheaf cohomology.

Initial discussion

Suppose f is an analytic function defined on a non-empty open subset U of the complex plane  If V is a larger open subset of  containing U, and F is an analytic function defined on V such that

then F is called an analytic continuation of f. In other words, the restriction of F to U is the function f we started with.

Analytic continuations are unique in the following sense: if V is the connected domain of two analytic functions F1 and F2 such that U is contained in V and for all z in U

then

on all of V. This is because F1 − F2 is an analytic function which vanishes on the open, connected domain U of f and hence must vanish on its entire domain. This follows directly from the identity theorem for holomorphic functions.

Applications
A common way to define functions in complex analysis proceeds by first specifying the function on a small domain only, and then extending it by analytic continuation.

In practice, this continuation is often done by first establishing some functional equation on the small domain and then using this equation to extend the domain. Examples are the Riemann zeta function and the gamma function.

The concept of a universal cover was first developed to define a natural domain for the analytic continuation of an analytic function. The idea of finding the maximal analytic continuation of a function in turn led to the development of the idea of Riemann surfaces.

Analytic continuation is used in Riemannian manifolds, solutions of Einstein's equations. For example, the analytic continuation of Schwarzschild coordinates into Kruskal–Szekeres coordinates.

Worked example

Begin with a particular analytic function . In this case, it is given by a power series centered at :

By the Cauchy–Hadamard theorem, its radius of convergence is 1. That is,  is defined and analytic on the open set  which has boundary .

Pretend we don't know that , and focus on recentering the power series at a different point :

 

Then . Using Cauchy's differentiation formula to calculate the new coefficients,

That is,

The plot shows the result for 

This particular  can be analytically continued to the punctured complex plane

Formal definition of a germ
The power series defined below is generalized by the idea of a germ. The general theory of analytic continuation and its generalizations is known as sheaf theory. Let

 

be a power series converging in the disk Dr(z0), r > 0, defined by

.

Note that without loss of generality, here and below, we will always assume that a maximal such r was chosen, even if that r is ∞. Also note that it would be equivalent to begin with an analytic function defined on some small open set. We say that the vector

is a germ of f. The base g0 of g is z0, the stem of g is (α0, α1, α2, ...) and the top g1 of g is α0. The top of g is the value of f at z0.

Any vector g = (z0, α0, α1, ...) is a germ if it represents a power series of an analytic function around z0 with some radius of convergence r > 0. Therefore, we can safely speak of the set of germs .

The topology of the set of germs
Let g and h be germs. If  where r is the radius of convergence of g and if the power series defined by g and h specify identical functions on the intersection of the two domains, then we say that h is generated by (or compatible with) g, and we write g ≥ h. This compatibility condition is neither transitive, symmetric nor antisymmetric. If we extend the relation by transitivity, we obtain a symmetric relation, which is therefore also an equivalence relation on germs (but not an ordering). This extension by transitivity is one definition of analytic continuation. The equivalence relation will be denoted .

Let r > 0, and let

We also note that the map defined by  where r is the radius of convergence of g, is a chart.

Examples of analytic continuation

is a power series corresponding to the natural logarithm near z = 1. This power series can be turned into a germ

This germ has a radius of convergence of 1, and so there is a sheaf S corresponding to it. This is the sheaf of the logarithm function.

The uniqueness theorem for analytic functions also extends to sheaves of analytic functions: if the sheaf of an analytic function contains the zero germ (i.e., the sheaf is uniformly zero in some neighborhood) then the entire sheaf is zero. Armed with this result, we can see that if we take any germ g of the sheaf S of the logarithm function, as described above, and turn it into a power series f(z) then this function will have the property that exp(f(z)) = z. If we had decided to use a version of the inverse function theorem for analytic functions, we could construct a wide variety of inverses for the exponential map, but we would discover that they are all represented by some germ in S. In that sense, S is the "one true inverse" of the exponential map.

In older literature, sheaves of analytic functions were called multi-valued functions. See sheaf for the general concept.

Natural boundary
Suppose that a power series has radius of convergence r and defines an analytic function f inside that disc.  Consider  points on the circle of convergence.  A point for which there is a neighbourhood  on which f has an analytic extension is regular, otherwise singular.  The circle is a natural boundary if all its points are singular.

More generally, we may apply the definition to any open connected domain on which f is analytic, and classify the points of the boundary of the domain as regular or singular: the domain boundary is then a natural boundary if all points are singular, in which case the domain is a domain of holomorphy.

Example I: A function with a natural boundary at zero (the prime zeta function)
For  we define the so-called prime zeta function, to be

Since the set of points

This implies that  has no analytic continuation for s left of (or at) zero, i.e., there is no continuation possible for  when .

Example II: A typical lacunary series (natural boundary as subsets of the unit circle)
For integers , we define the lacunary series of order c by the power series expansion

It is also not difficult to see that for any integer , we have another functional equation for  given by

the -th roots of unity.

The proof of this fact is generalized from a standard argument for the case where  Namely, for integers , let

Now the key part of the proof is to use the functional equation for  when  to show that

Thus for any arc on the boundary of the unit circle, there are an infinite number of points z within this arc such that . This condition is equivalent to saying that the circle  forms a natural boundary for the function  for any fixed choice of  Hence, there is no analytic continuation for these functions beyond the interior of the unit circle.

Monodromy theorem

The monodromy theorem gives a sufficient condition for the existence of a direct analytic continuation (i.e., an extension of an analytic function to an analytic function on a bigger set).

Suppose  is an open set and f an analytic function on D. If G is a simply connected domain containing D, such that f has an analytic continuation along every path in G, starting from some fixed point a in D, then f has a direct analytic continuation to G.

In the above language this means that if G is a simply connected domain, and S is a sheaf whose set of base points contains G, then there exists an analytic function f on G whose germs belong to S.

Hadamard's gap theorem

For a power series

 

with

the circle of convergence is a natural boundary. Such a power series is called lacunary.
This theorem has been substantially generalized by Eugen Fabry (see Fabry's gap theorem) and George Pólya.

Pólya's theorem 
Let

be a power series, then there exist εk ∈ {−1, 1} such that

 

has the convergence disc of f around z0 as a natural boundary.

The proof of this theorem makes use of Hadamard's gap theorem.

A useful theorem: A sufficient condition for analytic continuation to the non-positive integers

In most cases, if an analytic continuation of a complex function exists, it is given by an integral formula. The next theorem, provided its hypotheses are met, provides a sufficient condition under which we can continue an analytic function from its convergent points along the positive reals to arbitrary  (with the exception of at finitely-many poles). Moreover, the formula gives an explicit representation for the values of the continuation to the non-positive integers expressed exactly by higher order (integer) derivatives of the original function evaluated at zero.

Hypotheses of the theorem

We require that a function  satisfies the following conditions in order to apply the theorem on continuation of this function stated below:

 (T-1). The function must have continuous derivatives of all orders, i.e., .
 (T-2). We require that the function F is rapidly decreasing in that for all  we obtain the limiting behavior that  as t becomes unbounded, tending to infinity;
 (T-3).

The conclusion of the theorem

Let F be any function defined on the positive reals that satisfies all of the conditions (T1)-(T3) above. Moreover, we have that for any non-negative , the continuation of F at the point  is given explicitly by the formula

Examples

Example I: The connection of the Riemann zeta function to the Bernoulli numbers

We can apply the theorem to the function

which corresponds to the exponential generating function of the Bernoulli numbers, . For , we can express , since we can compute that the next integral formula for the reciprocal powers of the integers  holds for s in this range:

Now since the integrand of the last equation is a uniformly continuous function of t for each positive integer n, we have an integral representation for  whenever  given by

When we perform integration by parts to the Mellin transform integral for this , we also obtain the relation that

Moreover, since  for any fixed integer polynomial power of t, we meet the hypothesis of the theorem which requires that . The standard application of Taylor's theorem to the ordinary generating function of the Bernoulli numbers shows that . In particular, by the observation made above to shift , and these remarks, we can compute the values of the so-called trivial zeros of the Riemann zeta function (for ) and the rational-valued negative odd integer order constants, according to the formula

Example II: An interpretation of F as the summatory function for some arithmetic sequence

Suppose that F is a smooth, sufficiently decreasing function on the positive reals satisfying the additional condition that

In application to number theoretic contexts, we consider such F to be the summatory function of the arithmetic function f,

where we take  and the prime-notation on the previous sum corresponds to the standard conventions used to state Perron's theorem:

We are interested in the analytic continuation of the DGF of f, or equivalently of the Dirichlet series over f at s,

That is to say that, provided  has a continuation to the complex plane left of the origin, we can express the summatory function of any f by the inverse Mellin transform of the DGF of f continued to s with real parts less than zero as:

We can form the DGF, or Dirichlet generating function, of any prescribed f given our smooth target function F by performing summation by parts as

where  is the Laplace-Borel transform of F, which if

So it follows that if we write

alternately interpreted as a signed variant of the binomial transform of F, then we can express the DGF as the following Mellin transform at :

To continue the DGF of the Dirichlet inverse function to s inside this f-defined critical strip, we must require some knowledge of a functional equation for the DGF, that allows us to relate the s such that the Dirichlet series that defines this function initially is absolutely convergent to the values of s inside this strip—in essence, a formula providing that  is necessary to define the DGF in this strip.

See also
Mittag-Leffler star
Holomorphic functional calculus
Numerical analytic continuation

References

External links
 
 Analytic Continuation at MathPages

Analytic functions
Meromorphic functions
Generalizations